Tailscale Inc. is a software company based in Toronto, Canada. Tailscale develops an open-source software-defined mesh virtual private network (VPN) and a web-based management service. The company provides a zero config VPN as a service under the same name.

History 
Founded in 2019 by Google engineers Avery Pennarun, David Crawshaw, David Carney, and Brad Fitzpatrick, the company secured funding of $12 million in a Series A round in November 2020 led by Accel with seed investors, Heavybit and Uncork Capital participating. In May 2022, the company became a Unicorn, raising a $100 million Series B round, led by CRV and Insight Partners, with participation from existing investors.

The company's name is inspired from a research paper The Tail at Scale published by Google.

Software 
The open-source software acts in combination with the management service to establish peer-to-peer or relayed VPN communication with other clients using the WireGuard protocol. If the software fails to establish direct communication it falls back to using relays provided by the company. The IPv4 addresses given to clients are in the carrier-grade NAT reserved space. This was chosen to avoid interference with existing networks. The configuration also allows routing of traffic to networks behind the client on some clients.

See also 
 LogMeIn Hamachi

Notes

References

External links
 
 

Virtual private network services
Mesh networking